The 1987 Canarian regional election was held on Wednesday, 10 June 1987, to elect the 2nd Parliament of the Autonomous Community of the Canary Islands. All 60 seats in the Parliament were up for election. The election was held simultaneously with regional elections in twelve other autonomous communities and local elections all throughout Spain, as well as the 1987 European Parliament election.

Overview

Electoral system
The Parliament of the Canary Islands was the devolved, unicameral legislature of the autonomous community of the Canary Islands, having legislative power in regional matters as defined by the Spanish Constitution and the Canarian Statute of Autonomy, as well as the ability to vote confidence in or withdraw it from a President of the Government. Voting for the Parliament was on the basis of universal suffrage, which comprised all nationals over 18 years of age, registered in the Canary Islands and in full enjoyment of their political rights.

The 60 members of the Parliament of the Canary Islands were elected using the D'Hondt method and a closed list proportional representation, with an electoral threshold of 20 percent of valid votes—which included blank ballots—being applied in each constituency. Alternatively, parties could also enter the seat distribution as long as they reached three percent regionally. Seats were allocated to constituencies, corresponding to the islands of El Hierro, Fuerteventura, Gran Canaria, La Gomera, La Palma, Lanzarote and Tenerife. Each constituency was allocated a fixed number of seats: 3 for El Hierro, 7 for Fuerteventura, 15 for Gran Canaria, 4 for La Gomera, 8 for La Palma, 8 for Lanzarote and 15 for Tenerife.

The electoral law provided that parties, federations, coalitions and groupings of electors were allowed to present lists of candidates. However, groupings of electors were required to secure the signature of at least 1 percent of the electors registered in the constituency for which they sought election. Electors were barred from signing for more than one list of candidates. Concurrently, parties and federations intending to enter in coalition to take part jointly at an election were required to inform the relevant Electoral Commission within ten days of the election being called.

Election date
The term of the Parliament of the Canary Islands expired four years after the date of its previous election. The election Decree was required to be issued no later than the twenty-fifth day prior to the date of expiry of parliament and published on the following day in the Official Gazette of the Canary Islands, with election day taking place between the fifty-fourth and the sixtieth day from publication. The previous election was held on 8 May 1983, which meant that the legislature's term would have expired on 8 May 1987. The election Decree was required to be published no later than 14 April 1987, with the election taking place no later than the sixtieth day from publication, setting the latest possible election date for the Parliament on Saturday, 13 June 1987.

The Parliament of the Canary Islands could not be dissolved before the date of expiry of parliament except in the event of an investiture process failing to elect a regional President within a two-month period from the first ballot. In such a case, the Parliament was to be automatically dissolved and a snap election called, with elected deputies merely serving out what remained of their four-year terms.

Opinion polls
The table below lists voting intention estimates in reverse chronological order, showing the most recent first and using the dates when the survey fieldwork was done, as opposed to the date of publication. Where the fieldwork dates are unknown, the date of publication is given instead. The highest percentage figure in each polling survey is displayed with its background shaded in the leading party's colour. If a tie ensues, this is applied to the figures with the highest percentages. The "Lead" column on the right shows the percentage-point difference between the parties with the highest percentages in a poll. When available, seat projections determined by the polling organisations are displayed below (or in place of) the percentages in a smaller font; 31 seats were required for an absolute majority in the Parliament of the Canary Islands.

Results

Overall

Distribution by constituency

Notes

References
Opinion poll sources

Other

1987 in the Canary Islands
Canary Islands
Regional elections in the Canary Islands
June 1987 events in Europe